Chennai Public School is a Central Board of Secondary Education school located in Anna Nagar, Chennai, India.It also has another branch in Thirumazhisai, Chennai, Tamil Nadu, India. Chennai Public School was one of the first schools in India to have smart boards in all the classrooms and also a 5.1 theatre system in all classrooms. The pre-primary and early years learning programme at CPS is a system where the tenets of Montessori education are scientifically combined with tried and tested teaching methods, focussing on language development and logical thinking, for children to start their first steps into the education system.

History
The school was founded by N. Devarajan, Chairman (Chennai Public School) and Managing Trustee of KNET. The school features 'CARE'(Chennai Public School Academy for Research in Education). The Anna Nagar branch was started in 2009.

After about three years after the opening of the Central Board of Secondary Education-affiliated Anna Nagar branch, CPS Global School was started in Thirumazhisai. It has an IGSCE-based curriculum and a two-year international baccalaureate diploma program.

Events
The school's first annual day was celebrated grandly in 2012. The chief guest for the primary event was actor Karthi. For the seniors, Mr. Rosaiah, the Honourable Governor of Tamil Nadu was invited to be the chief guest but was unable to attend the occasion. Various Intra-School Award winners were also facilitated by the School. In the 2012-13 annual day, General Proficiency awards were given out for all round performance and Subject Topper Awards for every class. In its Annual day of 2013-14, held in Thirumazhisai, Padma Bhushan-awardee Dr. V. Shanta of Adyar Cancer Institute, Chennai, was invited as the chief guest. Actor Vikram Prabhu was also invited to give off the awards. In the 2015-16 annual day, actor Vishal was invited to give away awards and felicitate the students.

The school has also held sports events annually and has also played host to inter-school cultural events such as "Syndicate-2015".

Educational trips 
The school has taken the students on many educational trips including places in Tamil Nadu like Mahabalipuram, Kanchipuram, etc. At the National level, students have been taken to Mysore, Hyderabad, Delhi, Agra and many more places.

In 2011, the students participated in their first international student-exchange program in Singapore. In 2012, selected no. of students attended a Summer course at Kennedy Space Centre, Florida, USA. They also paid visits to New York City, Niagara Falls, Washington,D.C and Orlando. In 2014, few students participated in an educational trip to Australia. In November 2015, about 26 students participated in the 2nd WFUNA International Model United Nations (WIMUN) held at the United Nations Headquarters and Hotel Grand Hyatt, in New York City, USA. They also visited esteemed universities like MIT and Harvard in Cambridge, Massachusetts, USA.

Controversies
On 28 November 2018, during a field trip to Chokhi Dhani, Chennai, third grade students were reportedly locked and left alone in a room by staff members of Chokhi Dhani while the teachers left for lunch and where allegedly beaten by staff members for being noisy and not obeying.  Two employees of Chokhi Dhani were arrested under the Indian Penal Code Section 323 as well as under provisions of the Indian Child Welfare Act.

References
http://www.chennaipublicschool.com/

https://cpssoup.wordpress.com/author/cpssoup/

https://www.cpsglobalschool.com/
https://www.thenewsminute.com/article/chennai-chokhi-dhani-staff-hit-kids-threatened-make-them-drink-camels-urine-say-parents

External links

Schools in Chennai
Educational institutions established in 2009
2009 establishments in Tamil Nadu
High schools and secondary schools in Chennai
International schools in Chennai
Private schools in Chennai